is a Japanese actor who is represented by the talent agency Blue Label.

Filmography

TV series

Films

Awards

References

External links
 Official profile 

21st-century Japanese male actors
1992 births
Living people
Actors from Shizuoka Prefecture